Skylanders: Swap Force (stylized as Skylanders: SWAP Force) is a 2013
platform game developed by Vicarious Visions and Beenox and published by Activision. It is the third main game in the Skylanders video game and toy franchise, following 2012's Skylanders: Giants, which was a direct sequel to 2011's Skylanders: Spyro's Adventure (the spin-off of The Legend of Spyro series). It is the game before Skylanders: Trap Team and features the voices of John DiMaggio, Jess Harnell, Audrey Wasilewski, Richard Tatum, David Sobolov, Josh Keaton, Keythe Farley, Dave Wittenberg, Joey Camen, Gregg Berger, Troy Baker, Robin Atkin Downes, and Matthew Yang King.

It is the first Skylanders game to be released in North America before other regions, unlike the previous two games where Australia got the installments first. It is also the first Skylanders game not to be owned by Vivendi.

Synopsis 
For years, Wash Buckler, Blast Zone, Free Ranger, Freeze Blade, Night Shift, Magna Charge, Stink Bomb, Rattle Shake, Hoot Loop, Trap Shadow, Grilla Drilla, Spy Rise, Rubble Rouser, Doom Stone, Boom Jet and Fire Kraken - the SWAP Force protected the volcano that replenishes Skylands' magic. That is until an epic battle caught them in the eruption, blasted them apart, sent them to Earth, and gave them the ability to swap powers. Now they must mix and match their tops and bottoms to save the Elementals from being evilised, stop Kaos, and save Skylands.

Plot 
Every 100 years, four ancient creatures known as the Elementals, The Flashfin, the Terrasquid, the Frost Hound, and the Tree Spirit come together to replenish the magic in Skylands via a volcano known as Mount Cloudbreak. During the last eruption ceremony, something tragic happened. Kaos' Mother Kaossandra aimed to destroy the volcano, but a team of Skylanders defended it. After that, the volcano erupted, sending these Skylanders to Earth. The volcano's eruption gave these Skylanders the ability to swap their tops and bottoms, transforming them into the SWAP Force.

100 years passed, Flynn goes to see the eruption, when he suddenly find a girl riding on a giant bird. She explains that her home is in danger and asks Flynn to fly his ship through the mountain to lose a fleet of attacking creatures known as greebles. After losing them with the help from the Skylanders and Flynn's ship is damaged in the crash, Flynn introduces himself and the girl introduces herself as Tessa. The two of them make their way to Woodburrow, Tessa's home village and meet Rufus the village crier, where they discover that the chieftess has been captured. It is revealed that Kaos is the one leading the greebles, and decides to test out his new creation on them: The Evilizer, which uses petrified darkness to turn anything into an evil, purple crystal-covered version of itself with great power.

Flynn and Tessa make their way to where the chieftess is, and the Skylanders rescue her and bring her back to the village. However, Kaos has learned of the whereabouts of the Elementals' locations. He plans to evilize one of them, which will cause Mount Cloudbreak to turn evil and spread the darkness all across Skylands. Glumshanks begins to doubt Kaos's ability to take over, so Kaos then evilizes him and sends him to his dig site. Tessa takes the Skylanders to Mudwater Hollow, the location of the Flashfin and stop Kaos from evilizing it. They make their way to Kaos' dig site, and use a giant Stone Monkey to stop the operation before the Skylanders take care of Evil Glumshanks, turning him back to normal.

Glumshanks returns to Kaos who is disappointed in his failure, before he is greeted by his mother Kaossandra, who mocks him for his incompetence. After hearing a tip, the Skylanders attempt to find the Terrasquid and make their way toward the town of Motleyville hoping to find Sharpfin. When they arrive they instead find a servant of Kaos named Baron Von Shellshock, who evilizes Tessa's bird Whiskers and forces him to attack them. After dealing with Shellshock and turning Whiskers back to normal, Sharpfin promises to help the Skylanders find the Terrasquid and send his crew to fix Flynn's ship. They arrive at the location of the Terrasquid, but have to deal with one of Kaos's most deadly monsters, the Fire Viper. After they defeat the Fire Viper, Kaossandra shows up and decides to help her son.

Sharpfin takes Flynn and the Skylanders to a small village of elves in the tundra, where they meet Avril. After helping her deal with a cyclops problem in her village, she gives them the location of the Frost Hound, which is the Frostfest Mountains. After getting a lamp known as The Illuminator which is needed to see through the blizzard of the mountains; the Skylanders make their way to the Frost Hound and Kaossandra sends her servant Mesmerelda to stop them with her evil puppets. The Skylanders defeat Mesmerelda and rescue the Frost Hound.

Kaos then attacks Fantasm Forest, the home of the Tree Spirit, arming his trolls with evilized fire.  The Skylanders make their way to the forest, and defeat the trolls while also capturing Kaos. The eruption ceremony begins as the chieftess names Tessa the new chieftess of Woodburrow and the Elementals go to begin the eruption, when Kaossandra shows up, and takes back Kaos while stealing Tessa as well. With Flynn's newly repaired ship, the Skylanders, Flynn, and Sharpfin make their way to Kaos' fortress and enter to a confrontation with Kaossandra. She attempts to stop the Skylanders by sending her evil minions to attack, but the Skylanders trap her inside a mirror prison and rescue Tessa. Kaos then reveals that while this was happening, he was filling the volcano with petrified darkness to turn it into one massive Evilizer.

Flynn, Sharpfin, and Tessa take the Skylanders into the volcano and as Kaos tells Glumshanks to finish the pile of petrified darkness, it all comes falling down on top of him, transforming him into Super Evil Kaos, a giant Evilized version of himself. The Skylanders begin to battle him and after destroying the crystals on and in his body, revert him back to normal. They escape the volcano and Kaos and Glumshanks discover they have been swapped. The volcano then erupts replenishing the magic in Skylands as everyone returns to celebrate.

Gameplay 

The gameplay for SWAP Force is based on the two previous games, Skylanders: Spyro's Adventure and Skylanders: Giants. Players use a portal to bring real-life figures into the video game. For the new game, Skylanders are able to jump, and there are new swappable Skylanders. The new game also brings a new Portal of Power (and therefore is only sold as a starter pack). The new Portal was added because of the new technology that makes the SWAP Force characters work correctly. The older portals from the past two games would not be able to sense the top half of these new swappable characters. These sixteen new characters have top and bottom halves that can be separated from each other and recombined with the halves from other characters. This allows for a total of 256 combinations between all tops and bottoms. Another new feature of the swappable characters is that each has one of eight distinct ways of moving. These different movement types are necessary to enter certain side areas in the game called "SWAP Zone Challenges". Only characters with the correct bottom half can enter said areas. There are eight: Rocket, Spin, Dig, Stealth, Teleportation, Bounce, Speed and Climb.

Starter Packs 
As with the previous installments of the game, Skylanders: SWAP Force is available for purchase in starter kits that include a copy of the game itself, the Portal of Power, three characters to begin or supplement a player's collection, a poster of the entire SWAP Force collection, cards, stickers, and Web codes. The current starter packs and the characters include the following:

Console Starter Pack 
 Wash Buckler (SWAP Force - Water - Climb)
 Blast Zone (SWAP Force - Fire - Rocket)
 Ninja Stealth Elf (Series 3 - Life)

Nintendo 3DS Starter Pack 
 Rattle Shake (SWAP Force - Undead - Bounce)
 Free Ranger (SWAP Force - Air - Spin)
 Volcanic Lava Barf Eruptor (Series 3 - Fire - Alt Deco)

Pre-order bonuses 
 People who pre-ordered the Console Starter Pack or Gamestop Exclusive Dark Edition Starter Pack from GameStop received a never before released Skylanders: Giants Lightcore Hex figure and a poster.
 People who pre-ordered the Console Starter Pack from Toys "R" Us also received a Lightcore Hex figure, a poster, and any single Skylanders: SWAP Force character they chose.
 People who pre-ordered the Console Starter Pack from Walmart or Best Buy also received the Lightcore Hex figure.
 People who pre-ordered the Console Starter Pack from Target Corporation received a free, exclusive, physical magic/trading card that granted a hat (UFO Hat) when placed on the new Portal of Power, as well as the Lightcore Hex figure.

Characters 

SWAP Force features sixteen new core characters and sixteen new swappable characters, in addition to sixteen reposed Skylanders from previous games.

Reception 

Skylanders: Swap Force received "generally favorable" reviews for most platforms according to review aggregator Metacritic; the Nintendo 3DS version received "mixed or average" reviews. The Metacritic scores for the game were the highest and most positive of the series on most platforms. Gaming website Quarter to Three gave both the Wii U and Xbox 360 a perfect score of 5/5. Video game website Gaming Age gave the PlayStation 3 version the highest grade of an "A" and further commented that "whether you’re a Skylanders fan or a gamer who’s looking for a charming and unique family-friendly game series to get into, Skylanders Swap Force comes highly recommended."

References

External links 
 
 

2013 video games
3D platform games
Activision games
Beenox games
Cooperative video games
Dinosaurs in video games
Video games about size change
Multiplayer and single-player video games
Nintendo 3DS games
Nintendo Network games
PlayStation 3 games
PlayStation 4 games
Role-playing video games
Science fantasy video games
Superhero video games
Toys-to-life games
Vicarious Visions games
Video game sequels
Video games scored by Lorne Balfe
Wii games
Wii U games
Xbox 360 games
Xbox One games
Video games developed in the United States
Swap Force

ja:スパイロ・ザ・ドラゴン#スカイランダース スワップフォース